Canterbury earthquake can refer to:
 1888 North Canterbury earthquake
 1901 Cheviot earthquake that caused building damage in Christchurch.
 2010 Canterbury earthquake
 2011 Canterbury earthquake
 2016 Kaikoura earthquake

See also
List of earthquakes in New Zealand
Christchurch earthquake (disambiguation)